Conus zapatosensis is a species of sea snail, a marine gastropod mollusk in the family Conidae, the cone snails and their allies.

Like all species within the genus Conus, these snails are predatory and venomous. They are capable of "stinging" humans, therefore live ones should be handled carefully or not at all.

Description
The size of the shell varies between 19 mm and 49 mm.

Distribution
Conus zapatosensis is restricted to the central and southern Philippines with a dubiously reported specimen from Singapore. The type locality is situated near Zapatos Island, Negros, the Philippines. Paratypes are from Marinduque and Burias Straight.

References

External links
 The Conus Biodiversity website
 Cone Shells – Knights of the Sea
 

zapatosensis
Gastropods described in 1987